The women's 3000 metres steeplechase event at the 2015 African Games was held on 15 September.

Results

References

3000
2015 in women's athletics